The Romania women's national under-18 basketball team is a national basketball team of Romania, administered by the Romanian Basketball Federation.
It represents the country in women's international under-18 (under age 18) basketball competitions.

See also
Romania women's national basketball team
Romania women's national under-17 basketball team
Romania men's national under-19 basketball team

References

External links
Archived records of Romania team participations

Basketball in Romania
Basketball teams in Romania
Women's national under-18 basketball teams
Basketball
Women's sport in Romania